"Debbie Gibson Is Pregnant with My Two-Headed Love Child" is a song by Mojo Nixon and Skid Roper, released on the album Root Hog or Die in 1989.

"Incubating the incubus"
Known for their cultural parodies, Mojo Nixon and Skid Roper released two EPs and four full-length albums in the 1980s; their 1989 LP, Root Hog or Die!, considered by many fans to be their best, contained "Debbie Gibson Is Pregnant with My Two-Headed Love Child" as its lead single. In the song, Nixon not only asserts that he is the father of Gibson's child, but is also married to her (with Joan Collins performing the ceremony at a chapel in Las Vegas). He also manages to insult Rick Astley ("a pantywaist"), Spuds McKenzie ("hate that dog") and Tiffany ("wrestling in Jello") along the way, all in just two minutes and three seconds. The song is not, however, a direct attack on any one artist, but rather a parody of tabloid gossip (hence the title) and pop culture in a similar vein to Weird Al Yankovic's "Headline News" of several years later.

Not surprisingly, the song caused a bit of controversy. Gibson herself was even moved to write an answer song, "Stuffy White Girl", which she planned to release as a b-side, but ultimately thought better of it. It did give Mojo his first Billboard chart appearance, as the tune peaked at #16 on the Modern Rock listings in the summer of 1989.

Video
The music video, produced by T'Boo Dalton and directed by Scott Kalvert, features Nixon and Roper with lookalikes of Tiffany, Astley and Collins—and actress Winona Ryder as Debbie Gibson. Ryder (who once called the video "my favorite role of all time") wears a wedding dress and gives birth to "a Bigfoot baby, all covered in fur" with the requisite two heads. Kalvert's Boston partner and producer David Horgan was on the set offering Kalvert creative support.

However, MTV (perhaps fearing legal action) declined to add the video to its regular rotation, despite having Nixon as a network spokesman (itself surprising, since Mojo had first won fame with his song "Stuffin' Martha's Muffin", a reference to then-VJ Martha Quinn). Mojo and Skid did perform the song on MTV's late-night 120 Minutes (even then, Nixon was forced to mumble the word "fornication"), but the channel's refusal to air the video led to Mojo Nixon severing ties with the network.

External links

1989 singles
1989 songs
Debbie Gibson
Songs about actors
Cultural depictions of actors
Satirical songs
I.R.S. Records singles